Indira Devi Chaudhurani (29 December 1873 – 12 August 1960) was an Indian literary figure, author and musician. Born to the Tagore family, Indira was the younger child of Satyendranath Tagore and Jnanadanandini Devi and younger sister of Surendranath Tagore. She is noted for her work in scoring the music for a number of songs by her uncle Rabindranath, with whom she was particularly close. Indira Devi Chaudhurani died in 1960.

Biography 
Indira Devi was born on 29 December 1873 to Satyendranath Tagore and Jnanadanandini Devi in 1873, at Bijapur. She spent her childhood in England, in Brighton where her family owned the Medina Villas.  At this time she and her brother Surendranath came to be very close to her uncle Rabindranath who joined them a year later, and the brother and sister were said to have been the favourite of among the poet's nephews and nieces, and the author's letters to Indira were later published as Chinnapatra. Her early education was in India, at Auckland House in Simla and the Loreto Convent in Calcutta. In 1892, Indira graduated from Calcutta University with a First Class Honours in French. Indira translated into Bengali the works of John Ruskin, as well as French literature, and translated published translations of Rabindranath's works in English. Indira was a strong proponent of women's issues, and authored a number of works on the position of women in India.

Indira took an early interest in music, achieving proficiency in piano, violin and the sitar and training in both Indian classical music as well as Western classical music, later earning a diploma from Trinity College of Music. She is noted to have scored the music for almost two hundred of Tagore's songs. She was a composer of Brahmosangeet, and also authored a number of essays on music. In later life, Indira Devi was instrumental in the establishment of Sangit Bhavana at Visva-Bharati University, and served as the chancellor of the University for a brief period of time.

Indira was awarded Bhuvanmohini Gold Medal from Calcutta University in 1944, and received Desikottam (D.Litt.) from Visva Bharati University in 1957, she was also the inaugural awardee of Rabindra Award in 1959. Indira wed Pramatha Chaudhury in 1899.

References

External links
 Indira Devi Chaudhurani, from Scottish Centre for Tagore studies.

1873 births
1960 deaths
University of Calcutta alumni
Bengali writers
Bengali Hindus
Writers from Kolkata
Tagore family
Women writers from West Bengal
Musicians from Kolkata
Women musicians from West Bengal
19th-century Indian women musicians
19th-century Indian musicians
20th-century Indian women musicians
20th-century Indian musicians
20th-century Indian translators
Indian women translators
20th-century women writers
Writers in British India
Musicians in British India